Parathalassius is a genus of flies in the family Dolichopodidae. It is found along sandy sea coasts in both the Palaearctic and Nearctic realms. The name "Parathalassius" is of Greek origin, and can be translated as "near the sea".

Species
 Parathalassius abela Brooks & Cumming, 2017
 Parathalassius aldrichi Melander, 1906
 Parathalassius blasigii Mik, 1891
 Parathalassius candidatus Melander, 1906
 Parathalassius dilatus Brooks & Cumming, 2017
 Parathalassius infuscatus Brooks & Cumming, 2017
 Parathalassius maritimus Shamshev, 1998
 Parathalassius melanderi Cole, 1912
 Parathalassius midas Brooks & Cumming, 2017
 Parathalassius sinclairi Brooks & Cumming, 2017
 Parathalassius socali Brooks & Cumming, 2017
 Parathalassius susanae Brooks & Cumming, 2017
 Parathalassius ulrichi Shamshev, 1998
 Parathalassius uniformus Brooks & Cumming, 2017
 Parathalassius wheeleri Brooks & Cumming, 2017

Parathalassius capensis Smith, 1972 was moved to Plesiothalassius.

References

Dolichopodidae genera
Parathalassiinae
Taxa named by Josef Mik